Joseph Francis Busch (April 18, 1866—May 31, 1953) was an American prelate of the Catholic Church. He served as bishop of the Diocese of Lead in South Dakota from 1910 to 1915 and bishop of the Diocese of Saint Cloud in Minnesota from 1915 until his death in 1953.

Biography

Early life 
Joseph Busch was born on April 18, 1866, in Red Wing, Minnesota, the eldest of twelve children of Frederick and Anna M. (née Weimar) Busch. His parents were German immigrants; his father served for many years as president of the Goodhue County National Bank and was also president of the La Grange mills. 

Joseph Busch received his early education at the public and parochial schools of Red Wing, and afterwards attended parochial schools in Mankato. He then attended Canisius College in Buffalo, New York, before entering Campion College in Prairie du Chien, Wisconsin, where he completed his classical studies. Busch studied philosophy and theology at the University of Innsbruck in Austria.

Priesthood 
Busch was ordained to the priesthood for the Archdiocese of Saint Paul on July 28, 1889. He furthered his studies at the Catholic University of America in Washington, D.C., for one year. Busch then returned to Minnesota and served as secretary of Archbishop John Ireland for two years. He also served as a curate at St. Mary's Parish and St. Paul's Cathedral Parish, both in St. Paul. He founded St. Augustine's Parish of St. Paul in 1896, serving as its first pastor. Busch later served at St. Lawrence Parish in Minneapolis and St. Anne Parish in Le Sueur, Minnesota. In 1902, he established the diocesan missionary band of the archdiocese, serving as its director until 1910.

Bishop of Lead 
On April 9, 1910, Busch was appointed the second bishop of the Diocese of Lead by Pope Pius X. He received his episcopal consecration on May 19, 1910, from Archbishop Ireland, with Bishops James McGolrick and James Trobec serving as co-consecrators. During his tenure, he called for the abolition of work on Sundays and subsequently received so much criticism that he was forced to relocate to Rapid City.

Bishop of Saint Cloud 
On January 19, 1915, Busch was appointed the fourth Bishop of Saint Cloud in Minnesota by Pope Benedict XV. In 1917, he became the first chairman of the Stearns County chapter of the American Red Cross. He was named an assistant at the pontifical throne in 1923.

Joseph Busch died on May 31, 1953 at age 87.

Notes

1866 births
1953 deaths
People from Red Wing, Minnesota
American people of German descent
Catholic University of America alumni
20th-century Roman Catholic bishops in the United States
Roman Catholic bishops of Saint Cloud
Roman Catholic bishops of Lead